Callie Furnace is a historic iron furnace located near Glen Wilton, Botetourt County, Virginia. It was built as a hot-blast charcoal furnace around 1873–1874, and subsequently enlarged and converted into a coke furnace. In 1883, the stack was raised an additional five feet, and a tuyere was added. Callie Furnace went out of blast in 1884.

It was listed on the National Register of Historic Places in 1974.

References

Industrial buildings and structures on the National Register of Historic Places in Virginia
Industrial buildings completed in 1874
Buildings and structures in Botetourt County, Virginia
National Register of Historic Places in Botetourt County, Virginia
Blast furnaces in the United States
Ironworks in Virginia
George Washington and Jefferson National Forests
1874 establishments in Virginia